André Chappuis (born 16 March 1956) is a French former professional racing cyclist. He rode in five editions of the Tour de France.

References

External links

1956 births
Living people
French male cyclists
Place of birth missing (living people)